Santa Ana is a seaside resort in Canelones Department, Uruguay.

References

External links 

Populated places in the Canelones Department
Seaside resorts in Uruguay